10th Wing may refer to:

 10th Air Base Wing (earlier, 10th Reconnaissance Wing, 10th Tactical Reconnaissance Wing, 10th Tactical Fighter Wing), a unit of the United States Air Force
 10th Tactical Wing, a unit of the Belgian Air Force
 10th Fighter Wing, a unit of the United States Army Air Force of WWII

See also
 Tenth Army (disambiguation)
 X Corps (disambiguation)
 10th Division (disambiguation)
 10th Group (disambiguation)
 10th Brigade (disambiguation)
 10th Regiment (disambiguation)
 10 Squadron (disambiguation)
 X-wing (disambiguation)